Friedrich Wilhelm Eugen Döll (8 October 1750, Veilsdorf bei Hildburghausen - 30 March 1816, Gotha) was a German sculptor.

Life
A pupil under Ney, he spent time in Paris and Rome from 1770 to 1773 on behalf of Ernst (later duke of Gotha). In Rome he trained further under Raphael Mengs and Johann Friedrich Reiffenstein. On his return he was appointed court sculptor in 1781 and received commissions for busts, monuments and reliefs, particularly for the residences at Gotha, Anhalt-Dessau and Meiningen. In 1786 he became a professor (his own pupils included the painter Louise Seidler) and in 1787 was put in charge of art monuments in Gotha.

Works
His masterworks are: 
 Faith, Love and Hope at the Hauptkirche in Lüneburg
 22 stucco high-reliefs at the princely riding-school at Hauptreliefs in Stuck an der fürstlichen Reitbahn in Dessau
lifesize statue of Catherine II of Russia as Minerva
Catherine II, with a maiden before her offering at an altar
Winckelmann's monument in the Rotonda in Rome
busts of Sappho and Raphael Mengs
The New Muses, Bas-relief
Gustavus Adolphus of Sweden on a horse, crowned by victories, bas-relief
lifesize figures of Minerva, a Muse and Hygieia; 
grave-monument to the Gräfin von Einsiedel at Dresden and duke Karl von Meiningen; 
monument to Gotthold Ephraim Lessing at the Wolfenbüttel library
Kepler's statue at Regensburg.

Bibliography
 Literatur zu Friedrich Wilhelm Döll in der GBV
  
  
 
 Maaz, Bernhard: "Das Lächeln des Weisen. Englische Einflüsse in der deutschen Porträtplastik gegen 1800: Friedrich Wilhelm Eugen Doell und seine Kaestner-Büste", In: Jahrbuch der Berliner Museen, ISSN 0075-2207, Bd. 44 (2002), S.35-48
 Rau, Petra: "Friedrich Wilhelm Doell (1750 - 1816) : Leben und Werk", Cluj-Napoca : Editura Mega, 2003. – 518 S. : zahlr. Ill. Hochschulschrift: Zugl.: Mainz, Univ., Diss., 2000

External links
 Schloss Wilhelmsthal website

1750 births
1816 deaths
German sculptors
German male sculptors
People from Hildburghausen (district)